Navi Mumbai is a planned township of Mumbai on the west coast of the Indian state of Maharashtra. The area was proposed in 1971 as a new urban township of Mumbai by the Government of Maharashtra. A new public sector undertaking, CIDCO, was established for this purpose. Navi Mumbai is situated across two districts, Thane Part and Raigad. The city has been ranked 12th among 73 cities surveyed for cleanliness and hygiene by the Union Ministry of Urban Development (MoUD) and Quality Council of India (QCI) as a part of Swachh Bharat Abhiyan. Navi Mumbai is the largest planned city of india. Currently there are more than 1,400 completed high-rise buildings in Navi Mumbai and many more high-rise buildings are under construction.

Tallest buildings 
This includes spires and architectural details but does not include antenna masts. Only completed buildings, under-construction buildings, and on-hold buildings that have been topped out are included.

Upcoming projects 

This includes spires and architectural details but does not include antenna masts.

See also 

 List of tallest buildings in India
 List of tallest buildings in Mumbai
 List of tallest buildings and structures in the Indian subcontinent
 List of tallest buildings in Pune
 List of tallest buildings in Bangalore

References

Navi Mumbai
Buildings and structures in Navi Mumbai
Navi Mumbai-related lists
Lists of buildings and structures in Maharashtra